Melany Barnes (September 1, 1956) is a former Democratic member of the Kansas House of Representatives, who represented the 95th district. She replaced Tom Sawyer in the Fall of 2009 and served until 2011 when she lost her re-election bid to Republican Benny Boman.

References

External links
Kansas Legislature - Melany Barnes
Project Vote Smart profile

Living people
Democratic Party members of the Kansas House of Representatives
Women state legislators in Kansas
1956 births
20th-century American women politicians
20th-century American politicians
21st-century American women politicians
21st-century American politicians